Greeley can refer to:

Greeley (surname)

Places in the United States

Counties 
 Greeley County, Nebraska
 Greeley County, Kansas

Places 
 Greeley, Colorado, a city
 Greeley, Iowa, a city
 Greeley, Kansas, a city
 Greeley, Kentucky, an unincorporated community
 Greeley, Minnesota, an unincorporated community
 Greeley, Missouri, an unincorporated community
 Greeley Center, Nebraska, a village, commonly shortened to Greeley
 Greeley, Pennsylvania

Other 
Greeley Estates, a band from Arizona
 Greeley House (Chappaqua, New York)
 Horace Greeley High School

See also 
Greely (disambiguation)
Horace Greeley (disambiguation)